In the first edition of the tournament, Zsófia Gubacsi won the title by defeating Maria Elena Camerin 1–6, 6–3, 7–6(7–5) in the final.

Seeds

Draw

Finals

Top half

Bottom half

References

External links
 Official results archive (ITF)
 Official results archive (WTA)

2001 WTA Tour
Morocco Open
2001 in Moroccan tennis